Go Figure may refer to:

 Go Figure (album), an album by Spirit of the West
 Go Figure! (game), a math game in Microsoft's Windows Entertainment Pack
 Go Figure (film), a 2005 television movie
 Go Figure (soundtrack), the soundtrack to the film